West Michigan Edge was an American soccer team based in Grand Rapids, Michigan, United States. Founded in 1995, the team played in the USL Premier Development League (PDL), the fourth tier of the American Soccer Pyramid, until 2008, when the franchise folded and the team left the league.

The team played its home games at EK Stadium on the campus of East Kentwood High School in nearby Kentwood, Michigan. The team's colors were red, white and blue.

The club also fielded a team in the USL’s Super-20 League, a league for players 17 to 20 years of age run under the United Soccer Leagues umbrella.

History

The team played as Grand Rapids Explosion from 1995 to 1998, before changing names to West Michigan Explosion prior to the 1999 season, and adopting their final moniker in 2000.

Year-by-year

Head coaches
  Joey Barone (2005–2006)
  Mark Bell (2007)
  Stephen Herdsman (2008)

Stadia
 Holland Municipal Stadium; Holland, Michigan (2004)
 Stadium at Forest Hills Central High School; Grand Rapids, Michigan (2005–2007)
 Stadium at Mona Shores High School; Muskegon, Michigan 1 game (2005)
 Stadium at Cornerstone University; Grand Rapids, Michigan 4 games (2007)
 East Grand Rapids Memorial Field; Grand Rapids, Michigan 2 games (2007)
 Stadium at Crestwood Middle School; Kentwood, Michigan 1 game (2007)
 EK Stadium; Kentwood, Michigan (2008)

Average Attendances
2008: 125
2007: 89
2006: 298
2005: 412

External links
 West Michigan Edge

Soccer clubs in Michigan
Sports in Grand Rapids, Michigan
USISL teams
Defunct Premier Development League teams
1995 establishments in Michigan
2008 disestablishments in Michigan
Association football clubs established in 1995
Association football clubs disestablished in 2008